Live at San Quentin may refer to:

 Live at San Quentin (B.B. King album), 1990
 Live at San Quentin (Charles Manson album), 1993

See also 
 At San Quentin, the 1969 album by Johnny Cash